Queen Anne Grammar School for Girls was a single-gender female state grammar school in the city of York, England.  It began in 1906 as the Municipal Secondary School for Girls and was based in Brook Street.   At the end of 1909 the pupils were transferred to a new -acre site in Clifton.  The school's name was changed in 1920 and Queen Anne was chosen as it was situated on Queen Anne's Road. The school emblem was a sphinx underneath which was a furled ribbon reading the school motto Quod Potui Perfeci.

The school became a co-educational comprehensive in 1985.  It closed in June 2000 and in 2001 St Olave's School moved to the site.

Notable former pupils
 Kate Atkinson, author
 Barbara Hulme, botanist.
 Janet McTeer, OBE, actress
 Frances Morrell, Labour politician, Leader from 1983 to 1987 of the Inner London Education Authority (ILEA)
 Lynn Picknett, writer, researcher and lecturer

References 

1985 disestablishments in England
Defunct grammar schools in England
Defunct schools in York
Educational institutions established in 1920
Educational institutions disestablished in 1985
1920 establishments in England